Zeyt-e Sofla (also Romanized as Zeyt-e Soflá; also known as Pā’īn Zeyd and Zeyt-e Pā’īn) is a village in Miandorud-e Bozorg Rural District, in the Central District of Miandorud County, Mazandaran Province, Iran. At the 2006 census, its population was 1,610, in 446 families.

References 

Populated places in Miandorud County